William Smith (c. 1550 – 13 November 1626), of Mounthall, Theydon, Essex, was an English politician.

He was a Member (MP) of the Parliament of England for Ripon in 1589 and High Sheriff of Essex in 1620.

References

1550s births
1626 deaths
English MPs 1589
People from Epping Forest District
High Sheriffs of Essex